Oman Tribune is a popular English-language newspaper in Oman, based in Muscat.

It is the most popular English newspaper among high income, policy-making Omani, and in the diplomatic community. It offers both local and international content.

Oman Tribune carries articles and opinion pieces on Oman, other GCC nations (UAE, Qatar, Saudi Arabia, Bahrain and Kuwait), Arab countries as well as the Middle East developments. Its coverage of Oman is one of the best among all English newspapers of the nation as it draws extensively on the content of its sister publication Alwatan, which is a top Arabic newspaper of the Middle East. 

Oman Tribune additionally aggregates articles and graphics from The New York Times, Harvard Business Review, 
The Washington Post, Bloomberg, McClatchy Tribune News Service, Graphic News, and other news sources.

References 

2004 establishments in Oman
Daily newspapers published in Oman
Publications established in 2004
English-language newspapers published in Arab countries
Arab mass media